Pugh Dungan House is a historic home located in Doylestown, Bucks County, Pennsylvania. It was built about 1830, and is a -story, five bay, stuccoed brick and fieldstone dwelling in the Federal style. It features a single bay, pedimented portico supported by Doric order columns.  A two-story rear porch was added in the mid- to late-19th century.

It was added to the National Register of Historic Places in 1980.

References

Houses on the National Register of Historic Places in Pennsylvania
Federal architecture in Pennsylvania
Houses completed in 1830
Houses in Bucks County, Pennsylvania
1830 establishments in Pennsylvania
National Register of Historic Places in Bucks County, Pennsylvania
Individually listed contributing properties to historic districts on the National Register in Pennsylvania